Wanstead and Woodford  may refer to:
Municipal Borough of Wanstead and Woodford
Wanstead and Woodford (UK Parliament constituency)